Sparnotheriodon is an extinct genus of sparnotheriodontid litoptern that lived during the Middle Eocene of what is now Argentina, leaving fossils in the Sarmiento Formation.

Description 
Sparnotheriodon was a medium-sized litoptern. Litopterns reached such sizes again in the Miocene.

Taxonomy 
Sparnotheriodon was first named by Miguel Fernando Soria in 1980 on the basis of a mandible and teeth from the Sarmiento Formation of Argentina, with the type species being Sparnotheriodon epsilonoides. In 1983, Richard Cifelli tentatively synonymized Sparnotheriodon with Victorlemoinea. Other authors consider it distinct.

References 

Sparnotheriodontids
Eocene mammals of South America
Prehistoric placental genera
Mustersan
Paleogene Argentina
Fossils of Argentina
Fossil taxa described in 1980
Golfo San Jorge Basin
Sarmiento Formation